Grzegorz Pluta is a Polish wheelchair fencer. He represented Poland at the 2008 Summer Paralympics, at the 2012 Summer Paralympics and at the 2016 Summer Paralympics and he won the gold medal in the men's sabre B event in 2012.

References

External links 
 

Living people
Year of birth missing (living people)
Place of birth missing (living people)
Polish male fencers
Wheelchair fencers at the 2008 Summer Paralympics
Wheelchair fencers at the 2012 Summer Paralympics
Wheelchair fencers at the 2016 Summer Paralympics
Medalists at the 2012 Summer Paralympics
Paralympic gold medalists for Poland
Paralympic medalists in wheelchair fencing
Paralympic wheelchair fencers of Poland
21st-century Polish people